Vidhu Aggarwal is professor of English at Rollins in Winter Park, Florida, and is primarily known as a contemporary and modern poetics scholar. A poet and creative writer, her comic poetry work highlight a fascination with fluidity around identity and culture. She teaches poetry and postcolonial/transnational studies.

Career
Vidhu Aggarwal creates multi-media video, poetry, and scholarly works. Her work often touches on the intersection of identity and technology and the ongoing evolution of these concepts in modern society. She is the founding editor of the multi-media journal SPECS, worked with the John Sims Project on "The 13 Flag Funerals" in Florida, and with artist Bishakh Som on "Lady Humpadori," a poetry/comic book collaboration. She is on the executive board of Thinking Its Presences: Race, Advocacy, Solidarity in the Arts.  Her poems are in the Boston Review top 25 of 2016. She is a Kundiman Fellow. Her book of poems The Trouble with Humpadori (2016) received the Editor's Choice Prize from The (Great) Indian Poetry Collective. Her work has appeared in INK BRICK, The Missing Slate, Chicago Quarterly Review and Black Warrior Review.

Selected bibliography

Book
The Trouble with Humpadori (2016)

Essays and Interviews
"I'm nothing, if not":
COMIX, NARRATIVE, AND THE UNSTABLE OTHER IN "WHO'S HUMP?" (interviewed by Julian C. Chambliss)
Interview in LitBridge for National Poetry Month, April 2016
Interview with Cathleen Bota in Burrow Press's Fantastic Floridas

Poems

BOSTON REVIEW POET'S SAMPLER introduced by BHANU KAPIL with a comic by BISHAKH SOMSPHINX FRIEND in Pedestal
SHIVA, AGAIN & AGAIN and JACK SING-ALONG
The World is Flat Friend
CURSOR (EAST & WEST, TWINKLE TWINKLE
Filmi Playback Singer Ghazal
SOLDIERS in Sugar House Review
BATH in Bint el Nas

Podcasts and video
Functionally Literate Reading
The Drunken Odyssey Podcast

References

External links
 Vidhu Aggarwal website
Publications by Vidhu Aggarwal in the Rollins College Academic Commons

Living people
University of Southern California alumni
Rollins College faculty
Comics scholars
American women poets
Year of birth missing (living people)
American women academics
21st-century American women